Ralph Leo Hayes S.T.D. (September 21, 1884 – July 5, 1970) was an American prelate of the Roman Catholic Church. He served as the fourth bishop of the Diocese of Helena in Montana from 1933 to 1935, and as the fifth bishop of the Diocese of Davenport in Iowa from 1944 to 1966. 

Between his two episcopal appointments, Hayes served as the rector of the Pontifical North American College in Rome from 1935 to 1944.

Biography

Early life
Ralph Hayes was born on September 21, 1884, in Pittsburgh, Pennsylvania to Patrick Nagle and Mary Jane (O’Donnell) Hayes. He received his high school and college education at Holy Ghost College in Pittsburgh. He played on the college football, basketball, and baseball teams and in the summer on a semi-professional baseball team. Hayes studied for the priesthood at the Pontifical North American College and the University of the Congregation of Propagation of the Faith, both in Rome.

Priesthood 
Hayes was ordained into the priesthood in Rome by Cardinal Pietro Respighi for the Diocese of Pittsburgh on September 19, 1909. He initially served in a parish before being appointed to the diocesan mission band.  He later became the band director.  From 1917 to 1925, Hayes served as superintendent of schools for the diocese. He then spent seven years as pastor of St. Catherine of Siena Parish in Pittsburgh, doing what he called ‘’real priest’s work.”

Bishop of Helena
On June 23, 1933, Pope Pius XI appointed Hayes as the fourth bishop of the Diocese of Helena.  He was consecrated bishop on September 21, 1933 by Bishop Hugh Boyle. The principal co-consecrators were Bishops James Griffin and Alphonse Smith . Both co-consecrators were classmates of his in Rome. Hayes served the diocese as its bishop for two years.

Rector of Pontifical North American College
On October 26, 1935, Pope Pius XI appointed Hayes as titular bishop of Hieropolis and rector of the Pontifical North American College. 

Hayes was an admirer of the Fascist regime in Italy and its leader, Benito Mussolini. In a speech in Pennsylvania in October 1936, Hayes said of Mussolini that "...a true Italian patriot could have done neither more or better."  Hayes also accused the American media of spreading falsehoods about Mussolini and praised the Italian government for its support of the Catholic Church.  Hayes later received the Commander of the Order of the Crown award from the Government of Italy.

With the onset of World War II, Pope Pius XII temporarily closed all the national seminaries,  Hayes then returned to Pittsburgh, where he supervised the financial and business matters relating to the college. He also assisted Bishop Boyle in his episcopal responsibilities.

Bishop of Davenport
On November 16, 1944, Pope Pius XII appointed Hayes as fifth bishop of the Diocese of Davenport. He was installed in Sacred Heart Cathedral in Davenport on January 11, 1945. During his 22 years in Davenport, Hayes expanded school facilities across the diocese:  

 Muscatine Central Catholic High School (now closed) in Muscatine (1953) 
 Notre Dame High School in Burlington (1957) 
 Regina High School in Iowa City (1958)
 Assumption High School in Davenport (1958) 
 Aquinas High School (now Holy Trinity) in Fort Madison (1959) 
 Walsh High School (now closed) in Ottumwa (1960)
 Cardinal Stritch High School (now closed) in Keokuk (1965)  

Many of these communities had been served by parish high schools, while Davenport's new high school was a merger of St. Ambrose and Immaculate Conception academies. New buildings were also added at St. Ambrose, Marycrest and Mt. St. Claire Colleges. The four bishops of Iowa built Mt. St. Bernard’s Seminary in Dubuque.

Enrollment in the Catholic Schools reached their highest enrollments during Hayes’ episcopate. Elementary school enrollment reached its highest mark in 1960 at 12,074. The high schools reached their highest mark in 1965 with 4,129 students.

A four-day conference sponsored by the National Catholic Welfare Council was held in Davenport in 1949. It focused on the themes of industry, education and rural life. From 1954 to 1956, Hayes served as the president of the National Catholic Rural Life Conference. Its national convention was held in Davenport, Iowa in 1956.Pius XII appointed Hayes as assistant at the pontifical throne on April 30, 1958.

Hayes established the Papal Volunteers of Latin America in the diocese in February 1961 in response to a plea from Pope John XXIII. Missionaries from the diocese were sent to Cuernavaca, Mexico and Ponce, Puerto Rico. Hayes attended all four sessions of the Second Vatican Council in Rome during the 1960's, the American oldest bishop in attendance.

Retirement and legacy

On his 82nd birthday, September 21, 1966, Hayes submitted his resignation to the Holy See in compliance with the Vatican II decree Christus Dominus. His resignation was the first such resignation accepted by Pope Paul VI.On October 20, 1966, the pope accepted Hayes' resignation and named him as titular bishop of Naraggara. 

After his retirement, Hayes moved to the Kahl Home, a nursing home in Davenport.  Ralph Hayes died in Davenport on July 7, 1970 at the age of 85. Following his funeral in Sacred Heart Cathedral, Hayes was interred in the Bishop's Circle of Mt. Calvary Cemetery.

Hayes Hall, an academic building at St. Ambrose University and Bishop Hayes School in Muscatine, Iowa are named in his honor.

References

1884 births
1970 deaths
20th-century Roman Catholic bishops in the United States
Pontifical North American College rectors
Roman Catholic bishops of Davenport
Roman Catholic bishops of Helena
Participants in the Second Vatican Council
Religious leaders from Pittsburgh
Duquesne University alumni
Pontifical North American College alumni
Catholics from Montana